This is a list of Commelinaceae genera as of 2010.  This list includes all genera recognised as current by the Kew World Checklist of Selected Plant Families.

Genera list

Notes

References 

Note

External links

.
.
Commelinaceae
Commelinaceae